Sławomir Barul (born 28 August 1964) is a Polish cyclist. He competed in the men's cross-country mountain biking event at the 1996 Summer Olympics.

References

1964 births
Living people
Polish male cyclists
Olympic cyclists of Poland
Cyclists at the 1996 Summer Olympics
People from Opoczno